Squid, also known as ojingŏ, is a children's game played in South Korea. The game is named as such because the shape of the playing field drawn on the ground resembles that of a squid. There are regional variations of the name such as "squid gaisan" (with gaisan thought to be a variation of the Japanese word kaisen , "to start a war"), or "squid takkari". It is a multiplayer game, and the game is divided into two teams, offensive and defensive. There are two main purposes, either for the attackers to achieve the purpose of the attack, or for the teams to annihilate each other.

Gameplay
There are multiple versions of the rules for different areas and groups. Regional names differ.

General rule elements
The home bases for each of the teams are called "houses". The top circle is the house for the offensive team, the bottom rectangle is the house for the defensive team, and the middle triangle is the neutral ground between them.

The objective for the offensive team is to leave their house and move outside the figure around to the bottom of the defensive house (shown "open" on the diagram above), then pass through the figure back into the offensive house.

Attacking players are required to move only by hopping on one foot until they "promote" by either reaching area 2 having passed through area 3; or by hopping over the thin part of the figure between the two areas marked 4. Once promoted, they may use both feet.

The defensive team tries to eliminate the members of the offensive team by pushing them across a line of the figure they are not permitted to cross. Typically this means pushing players who have entered the figure out, or pushing players attempting to hop over the figure at 4 into the triangle. Defensive team members who leave the figure are also eliminated, so it is possible for the attackers to win by pushing all defenders out of the figure.

Regional variations
Because of the fact the game is informally played among children, there are no official rules, and their common features are mainly attested through multiple people who played it as children. However, a few examples of regional variations in rules are listed.

Regional names
In some parts of Busan Geoje and other regions in southern Kyungsang province, the game is called "ojingeo dalguji". Jongno region called the game "ojingeo po", Songpa district used the title "ojingeo isang", Daegu Gyeonggi province and southern Seoul used the name "ojingeo gaisan".

Regional rules

Squid ttaeng (Busan)
Squid ttaeng ( ojingeo ttaeng) is a regional variation of the squid game that is popular in Busan. The game usually involves ten or more participants. The origin of the game is assumed to be influenced by both the large presence of squid in the waters around Gadeokdo island and by the popularity of squid as a snack among local children. The game starts by dividing two teams, with at least ten people per team. A squid with a pentagon-shaped body and a round tail is drawn. The team that wins a game of rock paper scissors becomes the defensive team and the team that loses becomes the offensive team. If the offensive team reaches the house of the defensive team and shouts Ttaeng! (땡, the "ding" noise of a bell), the game is won by the offensive team and the two teams change sides.

Squid unification game
Squid unification game ( ojingeotongilnoli) is a regional variation of the squid game that is based in Haenam. The game is said to have originated from the Three Kingdoms period of Korea when the three kingdoms were fighting for land. In this version, the area which the offensive team has to reach while passing the defensive team is called the "unification area".

Ojingeo dalguji
For this variation, the person who is promoted is called cheolin (철 , "iron man"). The game starts when the offensive team yells the word ojingeo! (오징어, "Squid!") and the defensive team replies with the word dalguji! (달구지, "cart").

In popular culture 
The 2021 Netflix streaming television series Squid Game is eponymously named after the squid game, a deadly version of which is played during the series. For the Netflix version, the term for the promoted person was "Inspector Royal" (암행어사 amhaengŏsa).

References

South Korean games
Children's games